Shack Mills is an unincorporated community in Buchanan County, Virginia, in the United States.

History
A post office called Shack's Mills was open from 1871 until 1874. A mill started by Mcshack Ratliff caused the name to be selected.

References

Unincorporated communities in Buchanan County, Virginia
Unincorporated communities in Virginia